"What If a Woman" is a song by American R&B singer Joe. It was written by Joe, Joylon Skinner, and Allen "Allstar" Gordon for his fourth studio album Better Days (2001), while production as helmed by Joe and Gordon, with Joel Campbell providing additional production. Released as the album's second single, the song reached number 63 on the US Billboard Hot 100 and number 21 on the Hot R&B/Hip-Hop Songs chart.

Charts

Weekly charts

Year-end charts

References

2002 singles
2002 songs
Joe (singer) songs
Jive Records singles
Song recordings produced by Joe (singer)
Songs written by Joe (singer)
Songs written by Jolyon Skinner